Article Seven of the United States Constitution sets the number of state ratifications necessary for the Constitution to take effect and prescribes the method through which the states may ratify it. Under the terms of Article VII, constitutional ratification conventions were held in each of the thirteen states, with the ratification of nine states required for the Constitution to take effect. Delaware was the first state to ratify the Constitution, doing so on December 7, 1787. On June 21, 1788, New Hampshire became the ninth state to ratify the Constitution, ensuring that the Constitution would take effect. Rhode Island was the last state to ratify the Constitution under Article VII, doing so on May 29, 1790.

Text

Background
On September 20, 1787, three days after its adoption by the Constitutional Convention, the drafted Constitution was submitted to the Congress of the Confederation for its endorsement. After eight days of debate, the opposing sides came to the first of many compromises that would define the ratification process. The Confederation Congress voted to release the proposed Constitution to the states for their consideration, but neither endorsed nor opposed its ratification.

Ratification
The Constitution was ratified by the 13 states between December 7, 1787, and May 29, 1790, as follows:

Implementation

In 1787 and 1788, following the Constitutional Convention, a great debate took place throughout the United States over the Constitution that had been proposed. The supporters of the Constitution began the ratification campaign in those states where there was little or no controversy, postponing until later the more difficult ones.

On June 21, 1788, New Hampshire became the ninth state to ratify the Constitution, thus establishing it as the new framework of governance for the United States. Though officially enacted, four states, Virginia, New York, North Carolina, and Rhode Island remained outside the new government. The Congress of the Confederation chose March 4, 1789, as the day "for commencing proceedings under the Constitution." Virginia and New York ratified the Constitution before the members of the new Congress assembled on the appointed day to bring the new government into operation.

After twelve amendments, including the ten in the Bill of Rights, were sent to the states in June 1789, North Carolina ratified the Constitution. Finally, Rhode Island, after having rejected the Constitution in a March 1788 referendum, called a ratifying convention in 1790. Faced with the threat of being treated as a foreign government, it ratified the Constitution by just two votes.

See also
Timeline of drafting and ratification of the United States Constitution
The Federalist Papers
Anti-Federalist Papers

References

External links

Gary Lawson & Guy Seidman, When Did the Constitution become Law, 77Notre Dame L. Rev.1 (2001)
Steve Mount, The Federalists and Anti-Federalists, usconstitution.net (2003)

7